John Temple may refer to:

Politics
 John Temple (MP for Ripon) (1518–1558), MP for Ripon 1554 and Great Bedwyn 1558
 John Temple (Irish politician) (1632–1705), Attorney General of Ireland
 John Temple (diplomat) (1731–1798), 8th Baronet, first British consul-general to the United States
 Henry John Temple, 3rd Viscount Palmerston (1784–1865), British Liberal Party Prime Minister
 John Temple (Conservative politician) (1910–1994), British Conservative Party Member of Parliament
 John Temple (MP for Northampton), MP for Northampton 1407

Other
 John Temple (judge) (1600–1677), Master of the Rolls in Ireland
 Jonathan Temple (1796–1866), Los Angeles pioneer
 John Temple was lynched by a white mob on September 30, 1919, in Alabama. 
 Johnny Temple (musician) (1906–1968), blues musician
 Johnny Temple (1927–1994), baseball player
 John Temple (coach), American college baseball coach
 John Temple (surgeon), British surgeon
 Johnny Temple (bassist), American bassist
 John Temple (journalist), former editor of the Rocky Mountain News